Varalé is a village in northeastern Ivory Coast. It is in the sub-prefecture of Doropo, Doropo Department, Bounkani Region, Zanzan District.

Varalé was a commune until March 2012, when it became one of 1126 communes nationwide that were abolished.

Notes

Former communes of Ivory Coast
Populated places in Zanzan District
Populated places in Bounkani